Andrei Nikolayevich Kopylov (born 9 December 1972) is a former Russian professional footballer.

Club career
He made his professional debut in the Soviet Second League B in 1990 for FC Signal Izobilny.

References

1972 births
Sportspeople from Krasnodar Krai
Living people
Soviet footballers
Russian footballers
Association football midfielders
Russian Premier League players
FC Dynamo Stavropol players
FC Shinnik Yaroslavl players
FC Sokol Saratov players
FC Arsenal Tula players
FC Neftekhimik Nizhnekamsk players